Solhan is a town (belde) and seat of the Solhan District of Bingöl Province in Turkey. The mayor is Abdulhakim Yıldız (AK Party).

The town had a population of 20,217 in 2021. It is divided into the neighborhoods of Boğlan, Halimepınar, Yenimahalle and Yeşilova.

References

Populated places in Bingöl Province
Kurdish settlements in Bingöl Province
Towns in Turkey
Solhan District